Iñigo Idiakez Barkaiztegi (born 8 November 1973) is a Spanish former footballer who played as a midfielder or forward, and is a manager.

Beginning his career at Real Sociedad, he appeared in 254 official matches during his tenure while competing in ten La Liga seasons (36 goals scored). In his homeland, he also represented Segunda División clubs Oviedo and Rayo Vallecano. He moved to England in 2004 at the age of 30, where he represented Championship teams Derby County, Southampton and Queens Park Rangers, retiring in 2008; he played for Spain at under-21 and under-23 levels.

Idiakez went into coaching in 2009, working at amateur level in Spain before signing with Apollon Limassol from Cyprus as assistant manager. He moved back to England in 2013, taking up a youth coaching position at Leicester City. He joined Derby County as first-team coach in 2016, before being appointed at Luton Town.

Playing career

Club

Spain
Idiakez was born in San Sebastián, Gipuzkoa. In 1989 he joined local Real Sociedad's youth system, making his senior debut with the B-team where he shared teams with his older brother Imanol. He first appeared with the main squad on 8 November 1992 – on his 19th birthday – against Cádiz CF in La Liga; he did not become a regular until 1994–95 despite that early debut, playing nearly two full seasons with the reserves in Segunda División B.

Subsequently, Idiakez spent a further eight top flight campaigns with the Txuriurdin, going on to appear in more than 250 competitive games. During most of his spell he was a regular substitute and, in 1998–99 and 2000–01, scored a career-best seven league goals.

At the end of 2001–02, having finished his contract with Real Sociedad, Idiakez signed with Real Oviedo, who had just been relegated to Segunda División and were in a deep financial crisis. He only spent one year with the Asturias side, who finished the season penultimate, being relegated to the third level then demoted a further tier because of financial irregularities.

Idiakez then moved to Madrid's Rayo Vallecano, also from the second division. Again, his new club finished second from the bottom and was relegated at the end of the campaign.

England
In the summer of 2004, Derby County manager George Burley signed Idiakez up on a free transfer. He immediately adapted to the Championship, being named as the club's Player of the Season in his debut year as they finished in fourth place, but failed to win promotion through the play-offs; he was also included in the Championship PFA Team of the Year, having renewed his contract in April 2005 and later in August after reported advances from Wolverhampton Wanderers.

At Derby, Idiakez played in an advanced position and took most free kicks and corners. In 2005–06, under Phil Brown first and Terry Westley after, the team only finished in 20th position, narrowly avoiding relegation; he ended his stint at the Pride Park Stadium with 22 competitive goals in 96 matches.

On 31 August 2006, Idiakez was once again signed by Burley, moving to Southampton for a fee of around £250,000. In March of the following year, after only a handful of appearances for the Saints, he joined Queens Park Rangers on loan for a month, scoring once against Leicester City in a 3–1 away win and subsequently returning to St Mary's Stadium.

In the 2006–07 campaign play-off semi-final, on 15 May 2007, Southampton played Derby County: after the tie finished 4–4 on aggregate at extra time the match went to a penalty shootout, and Idiakez missed the crucial penalty, helping to send his former club through to the final.

Southampton released Idiakez at the end of 2007–08, and the player then underwent trials with Major League Soccer team San Jose Earthquakes and AFC Bournemouth, but was not offered a contract.

International
Idiakez played for Spain at under-21 level, his first cap arriving on 6 June 1995 in a 4–0 victory over Armenia held in Granada for the 1996 UEFA European Championship qualifying phase. He also participated in the 1996 Summer Olympics in Atlanta, featuring three times for the quarter-finalists.

Additionally, Idiakez appeared in four friendly games for the Basque Country unofficial team, scoring twice.

Coaching career
Idiakez returned to his hometown of in 2009, beginning his coaching career with the Añorga KKE youth team. Later, he was in charge of non-league sides SD Euskalduna and Berio FT also in the Basque Country.

In 2011, Idiakez completed his coaching qualifications when he earned the UEFA Pro Licence. A year later, he joined his former Derby and Southampton boss Burley as assistant manager at Apollon Limassol in the Cypriot First Division, with the pair leaving after only two games.

Idiakez returned to England in 2013, to take up the position of youth development coach at Premier League club Leicester City, managing the under-12 to under-16 age groups. He remained there for three years, before re-joining Derby County as first-team coach in July 2016; he left the latter only two months later, following the suspension of manager Nigel Pearson.

In September 2017, Idiakez was appointed as professional development phase lead coach at League Two's Luton Town. He returned to managerial duties on 1 December 2020, after being appointed in charge of Cultural y Deportiva Leonesa in his country's third division.

On 1 June 2022, Idiakez was appointed in charge of Cancún F.C., team that plays in Liga de Expansión MX, the Mexican second tier.

Honours
Spain U21
UEFA European Under-21 Championship runner-up: 1996

Individual
PFA Team of the Year: 2004–05 Football League Championship

References

External links

Official website

1973 births
Living people
Spanish footballers
Footballers from San Sebastián
Association football midfielders
Association football forwards
La Liga players
Segunda División players
Segunda División B players
Real Sociedad B footballers
Real Sociedad footballers
Real Oviedo players
Rayo Vallecano players
English Football League players
Derby County F.C. players
Southampton F.C. players
Queens Park Rangers F.C. players
Spain under-21 international footballers
Spain under-23 international footballers
Footballers at the 1996 Summer Olympics
Olympic footballers of Spain
Basque Country international footballers
Spanish expatriate footballers
Expatriate footballers in England
Spanish expatriate sportspeople in England
Spanish football managers
Segunda División B managers
Cultural Leonesa managers
Derby County F.C. non-playing staff
Luton Town F.C. non-playing staff
Association football coaches